Edmond Dalipi (born 3 March 1972 in) is a retired Albanian football player who played for Dinamo Tirana, KS Lushnja, Partizani Tirana, Bylis Ballsh, Vllaznia Shkodër and KF Laçi in Albania as well as Greek sides Apollon Smyrnis and Trikala.

He last managed Sopoti in the Albanian First Division in 2015.

International career
Dalipi made 16 appearances for the Albania national football team from 1993 to 2000.

References

External links

1972 births
Living people
Sportspeople from Lushnjë
Association football forwards
Albanian footballers
Albania international footballers
KS Lushnja players
FK Dinamo Tirana players
FK Partizani Tirana players
Apollon Smyrnis F.C. players
Trikala F.C. players
KF Bylis Ballsh players
KF Vllaznia Shkodër players
Luftëtari Gjirokastër players
KF Laçi players
KF Skrapari players
Albanian expatriate footballers
Expatriate footballers in Greece
Albanian expatriate sportspeople in Greece
Albanian football managers
KF Tërbuni Pukë managers
FK Dinamo Tirana managers